The  Washington Redskins season was the franchise's 38th season in the National Football League.  The team improved on their 5–9 record from 1968, by hiring legendary Green Bay Packers head coach Vince Lombardi. Sam Huff (a future member of the Pro Football Hall of Fame) came out of retirement specifically to play for Lombardi and finished with a record of 7–5–2.  The team played its home games at RFK Stadium (formerly D.C. Stadium).

Offseason
During Super Bowl III, rumors had circulated that Vince Lombardi had job offers from the Philadelphia Eagles, the Boston Patriots, and the Washington Redskins. The night before the Super Bowl, Lombardi met with Redskins president Edward Bennett Williams for dinner at Tony Sweet's restaurant. Lombardi agreed to coach the Redskins after Williams offered him complete authority over all personnel and football operations, the position of "Executive Vice President", and a 5% ownership stake in the team.

NFL Draft

Vince Lombardi
After stepping down as head coach of the Packers following the 1967 NFL season, a restless Lombardi returned to coaching in 1969 with the Washington Redskins, where he broke a string of 14 losing seasons. The 'Skins would finish with a record of 7–5–2, significant for a number of reasons. Lombardi discovered that rookie running back Larry Brown was deaf in one ear, something that had escaped his parents, schoolteachers, and previous coaches. Lombardi had observed Brown's habit of tilting his head in one direction when listening to signals being called, and walked behind him during drills and said "Larry." When Brown did not answer, the coach asked him to take a hearing exam. Brown was fitted with a hearing aid, and with this correction he would enjoy a successful NFL career.

Lombardi was the first coach to get soft-bellied quarterback Sonny Jurgensen, one of the league's premier forward passers, to get into the best condition he could. He coaxed former All-Pro linebacker Sam Huff out of retirement. He even changed the team's uniform design to reflect that of the Packers, with gold and white trim along the jersey biceps, and later a gold helmet. The foundation Lombardi laid was the groundwork for Washington's early 1970s success under former Los Angeles Rams Coach George Allen. Lombardi had brought a winning attitude to the Nation's Capital, in the same year that the nearby University of Maryland had hired "Lefty" Driesell to coach basketball and the hapless Washington Senators named Ted Williams as manager. It marked a renaissance in sports interest in the Nation's capitol.

Lombardi lasted only one season with the Redskins; he was diagnosed with terminal cancer after the 1969 season and died shortly before the 1970 regular season was to start.

Roster

Regular season

Schedule

Season summary

Week 9 vs Cowboys

President Richard Nixon was in attendance.

Week 12

    
    
    
    
    
    
    
    
    
    
    
    

Larry Brown 19 Rush, 138 Yds

Standings

References

 Redskins on Pro Football Reference

Washington
Washington Redskins seasons
Washington Redskins